Jaffna most often refers to Jaffna city, the capital of the Northern Province, Sri Lanka.

Jaffna may also refer to:
 Jaffna Municipal Council, the local authority for the city of Jaffna
 Jaffna District, the northernmost district of the Northern Province, Sri Lanka
 Jaffna Electoral District, a multi-member electoral district of Sri Lanka
 Jaffna Electoral District (1947–1989), a former single-member electoral district of Sri Lanka
 Jaffna Peninsula, the geographic location of most of Jaffna District
 Jaffna kingdom, a kingdom in northern Sri Lanka 8th-16th century
 Jaffna Tamil (disambiguation)
 Jaffna Diocese  (disambiguation), Roman Catholic diocese for Jaffna
 University of Jaffna
 Jaffna Hindu College, primary to high school
 Jaffna Youth Congress, which was the first of Sri Lanka's Youth Leagues
 Little Jaffna (disambiguation)
 The Jaffna (aircraft)

See also 

 Jaffa (disambiguation)